Simple Justice: The History of Brown v. Board of Education and Black America's Struggle for Equality, written by Richard Kluger and published by Alfred A. Knopf in two volumes 1975 and in a single-volume edition in 1976, was a finalist for the 1977 National Book Award in the History category. It is a detailed history of the litigation leading up to the United States Supreme Court decision in Brown v. Board of Education (1954) and its aftermath. The book has been called "a classic of legal history." On January 18, 1993, a documentary based on the book was broadcast as an episode of the American Experience series during the fifth season. A revised and expanded edition was published in 2004.

References

External links
Clips from the American Experience episode
Richard Kluger's Homepage for Simple Justice
Review in Yale Law Journal by Burke Marshall.

1975 non-fiction books
History books about the United States
Alfred A. Knopf books
Civil rights movement in popular culture